Babtie, Shaw and Morton was a firm of civil engineers based in Glasgow, Scotland, and noted for its work on bridges, dams and reservoirs.

History
It took its name following the 1906 merger of Babtie & Bonn (a partnership founded by John Babtie and Carl Bonn in 1897) and Shaw & Morton (founded by William Shaw and Hugh Morton).

The Babtie Group acquired consulting engineers Harris & Sutherland in 1997, then also Allott & Lomax in 2000.

The 3,500-strong Babtie Group was acquired by Jacobs Engineering Group in August 2004.

Projects
Notable design projects include the Backwater Reservoir, Kielder Water, and the Harland and Wolff shipbuilding dock in Belfast.

People
James Arthur Banks and William George Nicholson Geddes both became President of the Institution of Civil Engineers while partners in the firm.
Gordon Masterton, a director of Babtie from 1993 became the firm's third President of the ICE in 2005, whilst a Vice President of Jacobs.

References

Construction and civil engineering companies of Scotland
Companies based in Glasgow
Design companies established in 1906
British companies disestablished in 2004
1906 establishments in Scotland
2004 disestablishments in Scotland
British companies established in 1906
Construction and civil engineering companies established in 1906